Bekkam Venugopal  is an Indian film producer in Telugu cinema. He ventured into film production under his production company, Lucky Media. He started his career with film Tata Birla Madhyalo Laila in 2006 as a producer and made other films like Satyabhama, Maa Ayana Chanti Pilladu, Brahmalokam To Yamalokam via Bhulokam, Mem Vayasuku Vacham and Prema Ishq Kaadhal. And his recent movie Cinema Choopistha Mava was a super-hit which is both commercial and critical hit.

Filmography

As Producer

References

External links 
 
 
 

Date of birth missing (living people)
Living people
Telugu film producers
Film producers from Hyderabad, India
Indian film distributors
Year of birth missing (living people)